Butagest, also known as buterol, as well as 3β-hydroxy-6-methyl-17α-hydroxypregna-4,6-dien-20-one 3β-butanoate 17α-acetate or as 6-methyl-17α-hydroxy-δ6-progesterone 3β-butanoate 17α-acetate, is a steroidal progestin which was developed in Russia for potential clinical use but was never marketed. It is a modification of megestrol acetate in which the C3 ketone has been replaced with a C3β butanoyloxy moiety.

See also
 Acetomepregenol
 Clogestone
 Clogestone acetate
 Mecigestone

References

Acetate esters
Butyrate esters
Ketones
Pregnanes
Prodrugs
Progestogen esters
Progestogens
Russian drugs